Cheese crisp may refer to:

 Arizona cheese crisp, an open-faced, flour tortilla covered in shredded cheese
 Frico, an Italian food known as a cheese crisp in English
 A cheese-flavoured potato chip (American English) or potato crisp (British English)

See also
 Cheese puffs